These are the results of the 1992 Ibero-American Championships in Athletics which took place from 17 to 19 July 1992 at Estadio de La Cartuja in Seville, Spain.

Men's results

100 meters

Heat 1 – 17 July
Wind: +0.9 m/s

Heat 2 – 17 July
Wind: -1.4 m/s

Heat 3 – 17 July
Wind: -0.7 m/s

Heat 4 – 17 July
Wind: -1.4 m/s

Final – 17 July
Wind: -2.2 m/s

200 meters

Heat 1 – 18 July
Wind: +0.7 m/s

Heat 2 – 18 July
Wind: +0.8 m/s

Heat 3 – 18 July
Wind: +1.2 m/s

Heat 4 – 18 July
Wind: +0.2 m/s

Final – 18 July
Wind: -2.6 m/s

400 meters

Heat 1 – 17 July

Heat 2 – 17 July

Heat 3 – 17 July

Final – 18 July

800 meters

Heat 1 – 17 July

Heat 2 – 17 July

Heat 3 – 17 July

Final – 18 July

1500 meters
Final – 19 July

5000 meters
Final – 19 July

10,000 meters
Final – 17 July

3000 meters steeplechase
Final – 19 July

110 meters hurdles

Heat 1 – 18 July
Wind: -2.8 m/s

Heat 2 – 18 July
Wind: -3.5 m/s

Heat 3 – 18 July
Wind: -2.8 m/s

Final – 18 July
Wind: -0.6 m/s

400 meters hurdles

Heat 1 – 17 July

Heat 2 – 17 July

Heat 3 – 17 July

Final – 18 July

High jump
Final – 19 July

Pole vault
Final – 18 July

Long jump
Final – 17 July

Triple jump
Final – 19 July

Shot put
Final – 18 July

Discus throw
Final – 17 July

Hammer throw
Final – 17 July

Javelin throw
Final – 19 July

Decathlon
Final – 17–18 July

‡: It is reported that the 110m hurdles results of Francisco Javier Aledo and Jorge Camacho might have been switched onh the final list, because Camacho appears with 15.69 and Aledo with 15.61 on an intermediate result list.  In this case, Camacho would have achieved 6.843 pts and Aledo 7.026 pts.

20 kilometers walk
Final – 18 July

4x100 meters relay

Heat 1 – 18 July

Heat 2 – 18 July

Final – 19 July

4x400 meters relay

Final B – 19 July

Final A – 19 July

Women's results

100 meters

Heat 1 – 17 July
Wind: -1.2 m/s

Heat 2 – 17 July
Wind: -1.8 m/s

Final – 18 July
Wind: -0.8 m/s

200 meters

Heat 1 – 18 July
Wind: +0.2 m/s

Heat 2 – 18 July
Wind: +0.2 m/s

Heat 3 – 18 July
Wind: +1.1 m/s

Final – 18 July
Wind: -2.9 m/s

400 meters

Heat 1 – 17 July

Heat 2 – 17 July

Final – 18 July

800 meters

Heat 1 – 18 July

Heat 2 – 18 July

Final – 19 July

1500 meters
Final – 18 July

3000 meters
Final – 17 July

10,000 meters
Final – 18 July

100 meters hurdles

Heat 1 – 17 July
Wind: -1.1 m/s

Heat 2 – 17 July
Wind: -1.6 m/s

Final – 17 July
Wind: -1.1 m/s

400 meters hurdles

Heat 1 – 18 July

Heat 2 – 18 July

Final – 19 July

High jump
Final – 18 July

Long jump
Final – 18 July

Triple jump
Final – 17 July

Shot put
Final – 19 July

Discus throw
Final – 18 July

†: Rest of the series not known.

Javelin throw
Final – 17 July

Heptathlon
Final – 17–18 July

10,000 meters walk
Final – 17 July

4x100 meters relay
Final – 19 July

4x400 meters relay
Final – 19 July

References

Ibero-American Championships
Events at the Ibero-American Championships in Athletics